Stephen G. Bourne House, also known as Bourne-Hale House, is a historic home located at Fries, Grayson County, Virginia.  It was built about 1829, and is a two-story, rectangular, weatherboarded log structure on a fieldstone foundation.  It features a one-story, three-bay porch with square wood columns and two brick chimneys on the east end and one on the west end.

It was listed on the National Register of Historic Places in 2004.

References

Houses on the National Register of Historic Places in Virginia
Houses completed in 1829
Houses in Grayson County, Virginia
National Register of Historic Places in Grayson County, Virginia
Individually listed contributing properties to historic districts on the National Register in Virginia